"One in a Million You" is a single by Larry Graham from his album of the same name. The song was written by Sam Dees and produced by Larry Graham. "One in a Million You" was a gold record.

Chart performance 
Graham is the former bass player for Sly & the Family Stone and frontman for Graham Central Station.  
The ballad reached the top ten on the US Billboard Hot 100 pop chart, peaking at #9 in September 1980 and hit #1 on the R&B chart for two weeks.

Charts

Weekly charts

Year-end charts

Popular Culture
The song was used in the movie Nutty Professor II: The Klumps.

The song was covered by Dionne Warwick on her Arista album Hot! Live and Otherwise.

References

External links
 

1980 songs
1980 singles
Larry Graham songs
Songs written by Sam Dees
Warner Records singles